Southleigh is a village and civil parish in the East Devon district of Devon, England. Southleigh parish encompasses Wiscombe Park with its hill climb course.
 
The parish church is dedicated to St. Lawrence.

The parish is home to an Iron Age hill fort, Blackbury Castle (also known as Blackbury Camp). It was built during the 4th century BC. It was used by an Iron Age tribal people, probably for several hundred years. Blackbury Camp had impressive ramparts, and the single entrance was protected by a large triangular earthwork or barbican. Now surrounded by woodland, the hill fort is a popular spot for picnics.

References

External links

Villages in Devon